Hi-NRG (pronounced "high energy") is a genre of uptempo disco or electronic dance music (EDM) that originated in the United States during the late 1970s and early 1980s.

As a music genre, typified by fast tempo, staccato hi-hat rhythms (and the four-on-the-floor pattern), reverberated "intense" vocals and "pulsating" octave basslines, it was particularly influential on the disco scene. Its earliest association was with Italo disco.

Characteristics 
Whether hi-NRG is more rock-oriented than standard disco music is a matter of opinion. Hi-NRG can be heavily synthesized but it is not a prerequisite, and whether it is devoid of "funkiness" is, again, in the ear of the beholder.  Certainly, many artists perform their vocals in R&B and soul styles on hi-NRG tracks.
 The genre's tempo ranges between 120 and 140 beats per minute although typically it is around 127. The tempos cited here do not represent the full range of beats (BPM) of hi-NRG tracks; rather the tempos are retrieved from one source which is not an expert musical reference, but a sociological study of dance culture. Lyrics tend to be overtly camp, kitschy, tongue-in-cheek, sexually suggestive with double entendres but also occasionally sentimental or maudlin. 

The sound of high energy dance tracks, particularly electronic dance or disco, is immediately identifiable by its iconic basslines, pioneered by producer Giorgio Moroder, often programmed in repeating bass sequences, particularly 16th notes, which is characteristic of the hi-NRG electronic dance sound as in "I Feel Love" performed by Donna Summer and produced by Moroder.
The rhythm is characterized by an energetic, staccato, sequenced synthesizer sound of octave basslines or/and where the bass often takes the place of the hi-hat, alternating a more resonant note with a dampened note to signify the tempo of the record. There is also often heavy use of the clap sound found on drum machines.

One form of hi-NRG, as performed by Megatone Records artists and Ian Levine, is any uptempo disco and dance music, whether containing octave basslines or not, that often features covers of "classic" Motown hits (Boys Town Gang) and torch songs, and is often "theatrical" in performance, featuring female (and male) musicians with facetious diva personas and male musicians sometimes in "drag" (Sylvester, Divine), cabarets/musical theater (Vicki Sue Robinson, Sharon Redd). This style, that Stock Aitken Waterman were influenced by,<ref>Brewster, Bill & Broughton, Frank (April 12, 2011). The Record Players: DJ Revolutionaries. Page 81. Grove/Atlantic, Inc. Retrieved June 30, 2018.</ref> had a large cult following among LGBT club-goers in the 1980s, especially San Franciscan black and white gay men.

A second form, a precursor of Italian/Japanese "Eurobeat", with influences of techno and early Chicago house, primarily focuses on its characteristic sequenced "octave-jumping basslines" above anything else and in this form hi-NRG managed to surge into the mainstream with Stacey Q, Kim Wilde, and Laura Branigan. The octave basslines are also found in electroclash and in both cases may be traced to synthpop and even further back to Giorgio Moroder ("I Feel Love").

 Terminology 
Donna Summer was interviewed about her single "I Feel Love", which was a mostly electronic, relatively high-tempo Euro disco song without a strong funk component. In the interview, she said "this song became a hit because it has a high-energy vibe". Following that interview, the description "high-energy" was increasingly applied to high-tempo disco music, especially songs dominated by electronic timbres. The tempo threshold for high-energy disco was around 130 to 140 BPM. In the 1980s, the term "high-energy" was stylized as "hi-NRG". Eurobeat, dance-pop and freestyle artists such as Shannon, Stock Aitken & Waterman, Taylor Dayne, Freeez and Michael Sembello were also labeled as "hi-NRG" when sold in the United States.

In the 1980s, "hi-NRG" referred not just to any high-tempo disco/dance music, but to a specific genre, only somewhat disco-like.

Ian Levine, a hi-NRG DJ, the in-house DJ at London's Heaven nightclub in its early years and subsequently a record producer, defines hi-NRG as "melodic, straightforward dance music that's not too funky." Music journalist Simon Reynolds adds "The nonfunkiness was crucial. Slamming rather than swinging, hi-NRG's white European feel was accentuated by butt-bumping bass twangs at the end of each bar."

 History 
High-tempo disco music dates back to the mid-1970s. Early examples include several British disco songs by Biddu and Tina Charles in 1976 and Patrick Hernandez ("Born to Be Alive") in 1979.

Examples of high energy disco acts include Claudja Barry, Miquel Brown, Amanda Lear, France Joli, Sylvester, Divine, Amii Stewart, the Pointer Sisters, Lime, Lisa, and the Weather Girls. San Francisco-based Patrick Cowley and New York producer and composer Bobby Orlando were behind a number of high energy hits in this period. Orlando acts include Divine, the Flirts, and Claudja Barry.

In the early 1980s, high energy music found moderate mainstream popularity in Europe, while opposing both Euro disco and electro on the dance scene and it became mainstream in the gay community in the United States. Hi-NRG was totally reliant on technology and was all about "unfeasibly athletic dancing, bionic sex, and superhuman stamina". Freedom seemed to be embodied by a literal escape from human embodiment and synchrony with technology. However, this was generally limited to the bodies of men as evidenced by songs titled "Menergy", and "So Many Men, So Little Time". Producers such as Bobby Orlando and Patrick Cowley created "an aural fantasy of a futuristic club populated entirely by Tom of Finland studs."

During the same period, a genre of music styled as "hi-NRG" (EDM) became popular in Canada and the UK. The most popular groups of this style are Trans-X and Lime. The genre is also closely related to space disco; bands of this genre include Koto, Laserdance, and Cerrone. The hi-NRG sound also influenced techno and house music.

 Commercial success 
In 1983 in the UK, music magazine Record Mirror began publishing a weekly hi-NRG chart. Hi-NRG entered the mainstream with hits in the UK pop and dance charts (and the US dance charts), such as Hazell Dean's "Searchin' (I Gotta Find a Man)" and Evelyn Thomas's "High Energy".

In the mid-1980s, hi-NRG producers in the dance and pop charts included Ian Levine and Stock Aitken Waterman, both of whom worked with many different artists. Stock Aitken Waterman had two of the most successful hi-NRG singles ever with their productions of Dead or Alive's "You Spin Me Round (Like a Record)" (UK #1, CAN #1, US #11 in 1985) and Bananarama's "Venus" (US #1, CAN #1, UK #8 in 1986).  They also brought the genre full circle, in a sense, by writing and producing Donna Summer's 1989 hit "This Time I Know It's for Real" (UK #3, CAN #7, US #7).

American music magazine Dance Music Report'' published hi-NRG charts and related industry news in the mid to late 1980s as the genre reached its peak.  By 1990, however, techno and rave had superseded hi-NRG in popularity in many dance clubs. Despite this, hi-NRG music is still being produced and played in various forms, including many remixed versions of mainstream pop hits, some with re-recorded vocals. Later in the 1990s, nu-NRG music, a form of trance music, evolved from hi-NRG was born.

Artists

References

External links 

 Dance Music Reports Hi-NRG Top 200 of the 1980s
  Hazell Dean interview on hi-NRG, Record Mirror, August 1984
 Eurodance Magazine

 
1980s in music
Disco music genres
Electronic dance music genres
LGBT-related music
American styles of music
British styles of music